Terra Wellington is an American actress, writer, and producer. She is known for her portrayals of sophisticated women in peril, distress, or vulnerable situations, and works predominantly in independent films. Her writing and creative producing include both TV series, feature work, and morning television. She is also an environmental and wellness advocate, having written books and been a U.S. columnist and magazine editor.

Early life
Wellington grew up in both the Western U.S. states, principally in Utah and Colorado, and in the Chicago-midwest area in a middle-class family. Her mother worked as a freelance artist and author, though principally raised her children as a full-time homemaker.  And her father worked in sales, acted in community theater, and was a celebrated organist. She learned to play the piano at the age of 5.

Excelling in prose interpretation on the school's speech team, she attended Adlai E. Stevenson High School in Lincolnshire, Illinois, a northern Chicago suburb.

Career
In 2003, Wellington began appearing on "Good Morning Arizona" on Phoenix, Arizona's KTVK, as well as on KNXV-TV's "Sonoran Living," as a media personality talking about wellness lifestyle topics.  This expanded to include dozens of shows across the U.S., including The Montel Williams Show, WGN-TV, CBS News This Morning with Lynda Lopez, the Martha Stewart Living Radio, and the syndicated talk and news program The Daily Buzz.

She was the Wellness Editor for two national women's magazines in 2004–5, REAL and Fit Body.   During that time, Terra conducted one of the last media interviews of Actress Wendie Jo Sperber who was known for playing Linda McFly in Back to the Future. Wendie Jo died of cancer in November 2005.  She is the former U.S. syndicated columnist for Terra Wellington's Balanced Living and is the author of dozens of articles on wellness and environmental topics which have appeared in such publications as Los Angeles Family Magazine, Aisle 7 syndicated content, Richmond Parents Monthly, Houston Family Magazine, and websites like DietsinReview.com, FocusOrganic.com, TheGreenParent.com, and more.

Author
She is a contributor to "The Reducetarian Solution: How the Surprisingly Simple Act of Reducing the Amount of Meat in Your Diet Can Transform Your Health and the Planet" published by TarcherPerigee in April 2017.  Wellington is also the author of The Mom's Guide to Growing Your Family Green: Saving the Earth Begins at Home, published by St. Martin's Press in March 2009.

Actress
Additionally, in Los Angeles she studied Classical acting and spent time at The Second City improvisation center.  
Wellington has appeared on the CBS police procedural Criminal Minds and been a series regular in the New York Television Festival's special selection pilot Rx which was a family drama about medical marijuana.  She played a supporting role in The Last Days of Toussaint L'Ouverture, an award-winning provocative film that was dedicated to the victims of the 2010 Haiti earthquake.  And in 2016 she played the role of Elly's Aunt in "Mississippi Requiem," a black-and-white feature film executive produced by James Franco which combines four William Faulkner adapted stories. She also has played the lead in numerous additional films.

Charity and campaigning

Wellington has been a strong supporter of ocean conservation, the environment, and healthy living campaigns.

Filmography

Film

Television

References

External links 
 
 Official Site

21st-century American actresses
Living people
Year of birth missing (living people)